Boris Semyonovich Tsirelson (May 4, 1950 – January 21, 2020) was a Russian–Israeli mathematician and Professor of Mathematics at Tel Aviv University in Israel, as well as a Wikipedia editor.

Biography
Tsirelson was born in Leningrad to a Russian Jewish family. From his father Simeon's side, he was the great-nephew of rabbi Yehuda Leib Tsirelson, chief rabbi of Bessarabia from 1918 to 1941, and a prominent posek and Jewish leader. He obtained his Master of Science from the University of Leningrad and remained there to pursue graduate studies. He obtained his Ph.D. in 1975, with thesis "General properties of bounded Gaussian processes and related questions" written under the direction of Ildar Abdulovich Ibragimov.

Later, he participated in the refusenik movement, but only received permission to emigrate to Israel in 1991. From then until 2017, he was a professor at Tel-Aviv University.

In 1998 he was an Invited Speaker at the International Congress of Mathematicians in Berlin.

Contributions to mathematics
Tsirelson made notable contributions to probability theory and functional analysis. These include:

 Tsirelson's bound, in quantum mechanics, is an inequality, related to the issue of quantum nonlocality.
 Tsirelson space is an example of a reflexive Banach space in which neither a l p space nor a c0 space can be embedded.
 The Tsirelson drift, a counterexample in the theory of stochastic differential equations.
 The Gaussian isoperimetric inequality (proved by Vladimir Sudakov and Tsirelson, and independently by Christer Borell), stating that affine halfspaces are the isoperimetric sets for the Gaussian measure.

References

External links
 Tsirelson's homepage, at Tel Aviv University
 Mourning page, at Tel Aviv University

Mathematicians from Saint Petersburg
Israeli mathematicians
Israeli Jews
Israeli people of Russian-Jewish descent
Soviet emigrants to Israel
Academic staff of Tel Aviv University
1950 births
2020 deaths
Probability theorists
Wikipedia people